The Best Female Athlete ESPY Award, known alternatively as the Outstanding Female Athlete ESPY Award, has been presented annually at the ESPY Awards (Excellence in Sports Performance Yearly Award) since 1993 to the female voted to be, irrespective of nationality or sport contested, the best athlete in a given calendar year.  Between 1993 and 2004, the award voting panel comprised variously of fans; sportswriters and broadcasters, sports executives, and retired sportspersons, termed collectively experts; and ESPN personalities, but balloting thereafter has been exclusively by fans over the Internet from amongst choices selected by the ESPN Select Nominating Committee.  Through the 2001 iteration of the ESPY Awards, ceremonies were conducted in February of each year to honor achievements over the previous calendar year; awards presented thereafter are conferred in June and reflect performance from the June previous.

Five athletes, American soccer player Mia Hamm, Swedish golfer Annika Sörenstam, American alpine skier Lindsey Vonn, American tennis player Serena Williams, and American mixed martial artist Ronda Rousey have won the award twice. Hamm was honored in 1998 and 2000, Sörenstam in 2005 and 2006, Vonn in 2010 and 2011, Williams in 2003 and 2013, and Rousey in 2014 and 2015. Sörenstam, Osaka, and Monica Seles are the only honorees not to represent the United States at the time of their win.  Of the winners, six have played basketball, the most of any sport; the other sports with multiple individuals awarded are tennis, gymnastics, soccer, and swimming. The award wasn't rewarded in 2020 due to the COVID-19 pandemic.

List of winners

Statistics

See also

 List of sports awards honoring women
 Best Male Athlete ESPY Award

Notes

References

ESPY Awards
Sports awards honoring women
Women's sports in the United States
United States Espy Female
Awards established in 1993